Merel Baldé (born 10 February 1991) known by her stage name MEROL (stylized in capitals), is a Dutch actress and singer. She mainly gained fame through her singles "Lekker met de meiden" (fun with the girls) and "Hou je bek en bef me" (shut up and lick my pussy).

Early years 
Baldé was born in Dordrecht. Her father is account manager and her mother teaches Dutch. In 2014, she graduated from the Amsterdam Academy of Theatre and Dance. After graduating she featured in various Dutch theatre plays, television shows and the feature film All You Need Is Love.

Singing career

Breakthrough (2018) 
In 2018, Baldé released her first EP, Boter, under the name MEROL with her own label Ammehoela Records. From this EP, she released the song "Ik wil een kind van jou" (I want a child from you) as her debut single on Valentine's Day 2018, during which it was performed live on radio. In July of the same year, she released the summer single "Lekker met de meiden" (fun with the girls). The single mocks stereotypes of young (mainly Amsterdam) women, to whom Baldé incidentally includes herself. The single became a hit. She explained on the radio, that it first mainly was a hit among the “gays” and “then came the mainstream girls and now I get mainly straight guys in my DM who want to buy merchandise”. The Christmas single Kerst met de fam about ‘Christmas clichés’ was released at the end of 2018.

Hou je bek en bef me (2019) 
On Valentine's Day 2019, the controversial single "Hou je bek en bef me" (shut up and lick my pussy) was released. The explicit lyrics about women's sexual experience evoked many reactions. Baldé explained that she “always needs to be a little embarrassed about a song” and that although she herself found it “quite uncomfortable”, the song is indeed “autobiographical”. She wrote the song in response to the explicit sexuality in mostly male rappers' lyrics and wanted “a woman to also [sing] what she needs for once”. Whereas the artist initially, especially in response to this single, called herself an “accidental feminist”, she later backtracked on that and indicated that she considers feminism a very important cause. Apart from the succes in the Netherlands, the song was also a hit in Belgium. According to Baldé, there was a more prudish and indignant reaction to the song in Belgium than in the Netherlands. At the end of 2019, "Hou je bek en bef me" won Baldé her first award; Song of the Year 2019.

After breakthrough (2019–2020) 
In March 2019, Baldé gave her first and second public performances at Paradiso a major music podium in the Netherlands. The documentary Lekker met MEROL from July of that year shows the preparations for her first concert. Together with rapper Bokoesam, the singer released the single Geen reet (no ass) in mid-2019. According to Baldé, Geen reet was a body positivity statement against the reactions that ridiculed her body, and she cited American singer Lizzo as an inspiration. Furthermore, the single "Krijg het er geil van" (making me horny) was released in August in collaboration with rapper Gotu Jim. In October 2019, Baldé released her second EP titled "Superlatief" (superlative), of which the singles "Dan maar jij" (I guess then you) and "Superlatieven"' (Superlatives) had been previously released. To promote "Superlatief", Baldé went on a club tour through the Netherlands and Belgium and gave an end of the year concert at Paradiso, her fourth performance on the major pop stage that year.

As the first single of 2020, Baldé released "Slippertje" (little affair/accident/flip flop) in collaboration with the museum Mauritshuis. As part of the musical project View the Mauritshuis with your ears, she drew her inspiration for her adultery song from Joachim Wtewael's 1601 painting Mars and Venus Caught by Vulcan. She performed the song for the first time in the museum's foyer.

During the COVID-19 pandemic (2020–2021) 
To continue the tradition of Valentine's Day singles, the song "Binnendingen" (inside things) was released in February 2020. After the outbreak of the COVID-19 pandemic, Baldé posted a list of potential songs on her Instagram account. The song 'Houseparty' from that list, referring to the video calling app that exploded in popularity during the first COVID wave, was eventually recorded and released. That same week, in collaboration with comedian and television host Arjen Lubach, the song and music video "Ik **** je op afstand" (I **** you remotely) was released. Remotely referring to the COVID rules.

In the summer of 2020, the single "Je vais vite (op de campingdisco)" (I go fast (French) on the camping disco (Dutch)) was released, followed by "Knaldrang" (blast urge) in November. The music video for "Knaldrang" was shot in several Amsterdam clubs, which were closed for months due to the COVID crisis and received little government support or perspective. As such, the song was an "ode to nightlife".
'
Baldé's first single in 2021 was the fourth Valentine's Day single called "Foefsafari" (pussy safari) in which, just as in "Hou je bek en bef me" she called attention to the orgasm gap between women and men. In April 2021, Baldé performed twice for so-called test events, where visitors were admitted on the basis of a negative coronal test.

Troostprijs (2021 – now) 
In September 2021, Baldé released the single "Vol" (full). This song was the lead single of her debut album Troostprijs, released on 15 April 2022. The song was a hit in the Flemish charts due to her appearance in the Flemish program De Slimste Mens ter Wereld at the time.

Music style 
Baldé's style is described as pop with influences of “girl pop”, “synth-pop” and “electropop”, with a lot of camp. As for the lyrics, Baldé strives to “make fun of the Dutch language”. She wants her songs to contain irony and multiple layers.

Merol, the character 
The name 'Merol' came about when Baldé as a girl wanted to make a necklace of her name but only had one 'e'. Baldé wants to turn Merol into a real pop star, as she feels such a role is lacking in the down-to-earth Dutch music scene.

Discography

Albums 

|-
|align="left"|Troostprijs||2022||23-04-2022||8||5||
|}

EP's

Singles

Filmography and theatre

Music video's

Television

Film

Theatre

References 

Dutch singers
Dutch actors